The privacy commissioner of Canada is a non-partisan ombudsman and officer of the Parliament of Canada. The commissioner investigates complaints regarding violations of the federal Privacy Act, which deals with personal information held by the Government of Canada or the Personal Information Protection and Electronic Documents Act (PIPEDA), which deals with personal information held in federally regulated private sector industries. The commissioner reports to Parliament. 

Philippe Dufresne has served as the ninth and current privacy commissioner of Canada since he was appointed on June 27, 2022.

The privacy commissioner has the authority to audit, publish information about personal information-handling practices in the public and private sector, conduct research into privacy issues and promote awareness and understanding of privacy issues from the public.

Since 1983, the privacy commissioner has been a seven-year Governor in Council appointment made after consultation with the leaders of every political party in the Senate and House of Commons, and after the approval of both chambers. Prior to the Privacy Act of 1983, which lays out the present role and appointment process of the office, the appointment was made by the minister of justice on the advice of the chief commissioner of the Canadian Human Rights Commission.

The privacy commissioner reports to the House of Commons Standing Committee on Access to Information, Privacy and Ethics.

List of privacy commissioners
There have been eight privacy commissioners since the office was established in 1977.

See also
 Information and Privacy Commissioner of Ontario
Parliament of Canada

References

External links

Federal departments and agencies of Canada

Government agencies established in 1977
1977 establishments in Canada
Officers of the Parliament of Canada
Ombudsman posts